Lance Alan Mehl (born February 14, 1958) is a former professional American football player. He played eight seasons for the New York Jets of the National Football League (NFL), from 1980 to 1987. He was an All-American at Pennsylvania State University.

He was selected by the Jets in the third round (#69 overall) of the 1980 NFL Draft. He was named to the Pro Bowl in (1985).

Mehl was the leading tackler for the unbeaten 1978 Nittany Lion team. He earned a Bachelor of Science in Industrial Arts Education from Penn State University in 1980.

Mehl was a three-sport team captain at Bellaire High School in Bellaire, Ohio in football, baseball, and basketball.  

Today, Mehl is retired from working to help troubled youth. He is the father of four sons: Lance Jr, Lucas, Logan, and Layne.  Lance's mother Beulah  was the sister of Charles Meadows and William Meadows, both now deceased. they all grew up in south eastern Ohio.

According to Lance Mehl's 1984 Topps football card #153 Lance was the Jets leading interceptor in 1983. Lance is perhaps the club's most consistent defensive player. Recorded 10 tackles in 44-17 playoff win at Cincinnati Jan-9th-1983 As a bit of "Did You Know" the card said "Lance once worked in the coal mines of Ohio"  In 1985, he was selected to play in the Pro Bowl.

Mehl wore the number #56 while playing for the New York Jets.

In 2012,  Mehl testified as a character witness on behalf of former coach Jerry Sandusky, calling him, "a class act."  However, in a later interview, he said, "no doubt, if coach Sandusky is truly guilty of these crimes, he must be punished...and punished severely." Sandusky was later found guilty of 45 felony charges related to child rape and child endangerment.

References

External links
 Lance Mehl bio, databasefootball.com

1958 births
Living people
American football linebackers
New York Jets players
Penn State Nittany Lions football players
American Conference Pro Bowl players
People from Bellaire, Ohio
Players of American football from Ohio